Ambari is a 2009 Indian Kannada-language romance film written and directed by A. P. Arjun, making his debut. The film stars Yogesh and Supreetha. The film opened in January 2009 to positive reviews and went on to become the first film in 2009 to screen for over 100 days across many cinema halls in Karnataka.

The film deals with the journey the lead characters undertake from Bangalore to the Taj Mahal on a cycle.

Cast
Yogesh as Dhananjaya
Supreetha as Saraswathi/Saru
Rangayana Raghu
Petrol Prasanna
Sandeep
Kishori Ballal as granny of Saru
Dinesh Mangalore 
Aruna Balraj as Mother of Saru 
Mahesh Raj 
Vikram Mor 
Mahendran 
Vinod Varadaraj

Release
The film was released on 30 January 2009 all over Karnataka and performed well at the box-office. It crossed over 100 days screening in many theaters.

Soundtrack
All the songs are composed and scored by V. Harikrishna.

Reception

Critical response 

A critic from The Times of India scored the film at 3 out of 5 stars and says "Yogish is excellent and looks like the boy next door with controlled acting. Suprita is impressive. Rangayana Raghu excels. Sathya Hegde's camerawork is marvellous as is Harikrishna's music. Ravivarma's action scenes are thrilling"  A critic from Sify wrote "Supritha has a good future. She has the heroine material in her. Rangayana Raghu isroutine and Petrol Prasanna as villain is painful. The melody is missing from V.Harikrishna. Satya Hegde has given a lovely cinematography once again after 'Dhuniya'."

Awards
Karnataka State Film Award for Best Actor - Yogesh
Karnataka State Film Award for Best Male Playback Singer - Chetan Sosca - "Yaare Nee devateya"
Filmfare Award for Best Male Playback Singer - Kannada - Chetan Sosca - "Yaare Nee devateya"
Suvarna Award for Best Male Playback singer - Chetan Sosca - "Yaare Nee devateya"
Mirchi Music award for Best Male Playback singer - Chetan Sosca - "Yaare Nee devateya"

References

External links
Ambari Movie review

2009 films
2000s Kannada-language films
Indian romance films
2000s road movies
Indian road movies
Films scored by V. Harikrishna
2009 directorial debut films
2009 romance films